The 1972 PGA Tour season was played from January 6 to December 3. The season consisted of 47 official money events. Jack Nicklaus won the most tournaments, seven, and there were five first-time winners. Nicklaus's wins included his fourth Masters and third U.S. Open. The tournament results and award winners are listed below.

Rogelio Gonzales suspension
At the Greater New Orleans Open, Tour rookie golfer from Colombia Rogelio Gonzales was disqualified after it was learned he had changed his scorecard earlier in the tournament. In addition to his disqualification, the PGA Tour lifted Gonzales playing privileges.

Schedule
The following table lists official events during the 1972 season.

Unofficial events
The following events were sanctioned by the PGA Tour, but did not carry official money, nor were wins official.

Awards

See also 

 1971 PGA Tour Qualifying School graduates

Notes

References

External links
PGA Tour official site
1972 season coverage at golfstats.com

PGA Tour seasons
PGA Tour